rRNA-processing protein FCF1 homolog is a protein that in humans is encoded by the FCF1 gene.

References

Further reading